Scott H. Decker (born July 17, 1950) is an American criminologist and Foundation Professor of Criminology and Criminal Justice at Arizona State University (ASU). He is known for researching gang violence and criminal justice policy.

Education
Decker received his B.A. from DePauw University in 1972, and his M.A. and Ph.D. in criminology from Florida State University in 1974 and 1976, respectively.

Career
Decker joined the faculty of the University of Missouri-St. Louis in 1977 as an assistant professor in the Department of Criminology and Criminal Justice. In 1986, he became a full professor at the University of Missouri-St. Louis, and in 2001, he was named a curator's professor there. In 2006, he left the University of Missouri to join the faculty at Arizona State University, where he was named a Foundation Professor in 2010 and an Honors College Professor in 2014. From 2006 to 2014, he was the first director of Arizona State University's School of Criminology and Criminal Justice. In 2015, he became the first director of ASU's Center for Public Criminology.

References

External links
Scott Decker's faculty page (archived, 2015)

Arizona State University faculty
1950 births
Living people
University of Missouri–St. Louis faculty
DePauw University alumni
Florida State University alumni
American criminologists